The First Tycoon: The Epic Life of Cornelius Vanderbilt is a 2009 biography of Cornelius Vanderbilt, a 19th-century American industrialist and philanthropist who built his fortune in the shipping and railroad industries, becoming one of the wealthiest Americans in the history of the U.S.  It was written by American biographer T. J. Stiles. The book was honored with the 2009 National Book Award for Nonfiction and the 2010 Pulitzer Prize for Biography or Autobiography.

Summary 
Stiles spent seven years researching and studying the life and worldwide influence of Cornelius Vanderbilt, the patriarch of the Vanderbilt dynasty who made his wealth in the shipping and railroad industries and financially supported the founding of Vanderbilt University. The First Tycoon describes Vanderbilt's life from his 1794 birth to his death in 1877, shedding light on his leadership in expanding railroad transportation into a revolution and establishing the modern corporation.

Stiles raised serious doubts about the claims and secret sources about Vanderbilt.

Reception 
The First Tycoon went on to win the 2009 National Book Award for Nonfiction and the 2010 Pulitzer Prize for Biography or Autobiography. It was also named a New York Times Notable Book and one of the best books of the year by The New Yorker, the Financial Times, the Christian Science Monitor, the Boston Globe, and the Philadelphia Inquirer. Additional reviews were offered by Foreign Affairs magazine, the Washington Post, the New York Times Book Review, the New York Times, and Newsweek.

Honors and awards 
 2009 National Book Award for Nonfiction
 2010 Pulitzer Prize for Biography or Autobiography

References

Further reading 
 Stile, T. J. (2009). The First Tycoon: The Epic Life of Cornelius Vanderbilt, New York: Alfred A. Knopf, 736 pages. 

Biographies about businesspeople
National Book Award for Nonfiction winning works
Pulitzer Prize for Biography or Autobiography-winning works
Vanderbilt family
2009 non-fiction books